Paranormal Activity 3 is a 2011 American found footage supernatural horror film, directed by Henry Joost and Ariel Schulman. It is the third (chronologically, the first) installment of the Paranormal Activity series and serves as a prequel, mostly set 18 years prior to the events of the first two films. It was released in theaters on October 21, 2011. Paranormal Activity 3 was also Joost and Schulman's first horror film.

The film broke financial records upon release, setting a new record for a midnight opening for a horror film ($8 million) and the best opening day for a horror film in the United States ($26.2 million).

Plot
In March 2005, Katie delivers a box of old videotapes to her pregnant sister Kristi Rey and her husband Daniel, which holds footage of young Katie and Kristi with their mother, Julie, and her boyfriend Dennis. A year later, Kristi and Daniel's house is ransacked and the tapes are missing. The VHS footage, filmed in 1988, makes up the rest of the film. A young Katie and Kristi are living with their mother Julie and her boyfriend Dennis (as their biological father had left them for reasons unknown). Dennis notices that since Kristi's imaginary friend "Tobi" appeared, strange things have been happening around the house. After filming an earthquake in the couple's bedroom and noticing an invisible figure in the footage, Dennis is advised by his friend Randy to place cameras throughout the house. Dennis and Julie hire a babysitter named Lisa to watch the kids, but she becomes desperate to leave due to several terrifying incidents. The following night, Kristi tells Tobi they're not friends anymore.

Dennis discovers a strange symbol in the girls' closet and finds the same symbol in a book about demonology. When Kristi becomes mysteriously ill, Julie and Dennis take her to the hospital. When Katie is left home with Randy, they are attacked by a black figure which violently flings furniture across the room and scratches Randy on his torso. When Julie and Dennis return home, he informs her that the symbol belonged to a witches' coven that brainwashed girls of child-bearing age into having sons, then forced them to give up their sons and forget everything afterward, but Julie dismisses his claim.

The demon harms Katie until Kristi agrees to do what it asks. She asks her mother to take them to her grandmother Lois' house in Moorpark, California, and Julie agrees after encountering frightening activity herself. At 1:00 AM in Moorpark, Julie and Dennis are awoken by loud disturbances and Julie goes to investigate. When she fails to return, Dennis goes to look for her. He finds occult imagery on the walls, including the symbol from the girls' room, and discovers several women, including Lois, dressed in black. He flees back to the house, with the women in pursuit, and finds Julie's limp body levitating above the ground before it is thrown at Dennis. Dennis hides with Kristi in a closet before walking into the kitchen, where Dennis, from a window, sees the women circling around a bonfire outside. Katie and Lois, in the same room as Julie's body, kill Dennis. Lois then beckons to Kristi and Katie and tells them to get ready. Before they head upstairs, Kristi calls for Tobi and growling sounds are heard upstairs until the camera cuts out and the film ends.

Cast
 Chris Smith as Dennis
 Lauren Bittner as Julie
 Chloe Csengery as young Katie
 Katie Featherston as adult Katie 
 Jessica Tyler Brown as young Kristi
 Sprague Grayden as adult Kristi
 Dustin Ingram as Randy Rosen
 Hallie Foote as Grandma Lois
 Johanna Braddy as Lisa
 Brian Boland as Daniel Rey
 Bailey Brown as Bailey
 Maria Olsen as Creepy Woman

Production
Principal photography began on June 6, 2011 and ended on August 5. At the time during production, the film was under the name "Sports Camp". The film was directed by Henry Joost and Ariel Schulman (who both directed the documentary Catfish). Jason Blum, Oren Peli and Steven Schneider produced, along with Akiva Goldsman serving as executive producer. With a script written by Christopher Landon, the prequel was released on October 21, 2011. In some of the trailers, many of the scenes weren't shown in the final cut, which angered many of the fans.

Once again using unique social media strategy after the success of the first two films, Paranormal Activity 3 created the "Tweet Your Scream" campaign on Twitter in preparation for the release.

Reception

Box office
The film performed even better than its predecessors, grossing $8 million from midnight showings, setting yet another record for a horror film. Its total Friday gross was an estimated $26.2 million, which was the best opening day gross for a 2011 film since Harry Potter and the Deathly Hallows – Part 2 in July. Bringing its total to $52.6 million, it set a new record for the franchise, a horror film (Paranormal Activity 2, $40.6 million). At the time of its release, it set a new opening weekend record for a film released in the month of October as well as the fall season (later surpassed by Gravity in 2013 with a weekend gross of $55.8 million).

Paranormal Activity 3 grossed $104,028,807 in the United States and Canada, along with $101,675,011 in other countries, for a worldwide total of $205,703,818, making it the highest-grossing film in the 'Paranormal Activity' series.

Critical response
On Rotten Tomatoes the film has an approval rating of 66% based on reviews from 125 critics, with an average rating of 6/10. The website's consensus is, "While the jolts and thrills are undeniably subject to the diminishing returns that plague most horror sequels, Paranormal Activity 3 is a surprisingly spine-tingling treat." Metacritic, gives the film a weighted average score of 59 out of 100 based on reviews from 25 critics, indicating "mixed or average reviews". CinemaScore polls reported that the average grade moviegoers gave the film was a "C+" on an A+ to F scale.

Roger Ebert of the Chicago Sun-Times gave the film a single star out of four, stating that "the appeal has worn threadbare", but predicting that the film would fare well at the box office nevertheless.
Kim Newman of Empire Magazine gave it 3 out of 5 and wrote: "If you don't expect innovation from a part three, then this won't disappoint: it may be hokey, but the scares still work."

Home media
Paranormal Activity 3 was released on DVD/Blu-ray and video on demand/pay-per-view on January 24, 2012, and includes an unrated director's cut, "lost tapes" (deleted scenes), theatrical version, and digital copy. A one-disc theatrical version of the movie was released on DVD on February 14, 2012.

Sequel

In January 2012, Paramount announced there would be a fourth film in the franchise. It was to be directed by Henry Joost and Ariel Schulman, the directors of the third film. Filming started in late June. The film was released on October 19, 2012. On August 1, 2012, the first trailer was released, teasing this film with the tagline, "all the activity has led to this".

References

External links
 
 
 
 

Paranormal Activity (film series)
2011 films
2010s English-language films
2011 horror films
American supernatural horror films
American independent films
Demons in film
Films produced by Jason Blum
Films set in 1988
Films set in 2005
Films set in California
Films about witchcraft
Prequel films
Blumhouse Productions films
Paramount Pictures films
Films directed by Henry Joost and Ariel Schulman
Films with screenplays by Christopher B. Landon
2010s American films
American prequel films
Found footage films